The Presidents Cup is a series of men's golf matches between a team representing the United States and an International Team representing the rest of the world minus Europe. Europe competes against the United States in a similar but considerably older event, the Ryder Cup.

The Presidents Cup has been held biennially since 1994. Initially it was held in even-numbered years, with the Ryder Cup being held in odd numbered years. However, the cancellation of the 2001 Ryder Cup due to the September 11 attacks pushed both tournaments back a year, and the Presidents Cup was then held in odd-numbered years. It reverted to even-number years following the postponement of the 2020 Ryder Cup due to the COVID-19 pandemic. It is hosted alternately in the United States and in countries represented by the International Team.

The International team competes under a specifically designed logo and flag.

The next Presidents Cup will be held from September 24–29, 2024 at Royal Montreal Golf Club in Montreal, Quebec, Canada.

Format
The scoring system of the event is match play. The format is drawn from the Ryder Cup and consists of 12 players per side. Each team has a captain, usually a highly respected golf figure, who is responsible for choosing the pairs in the doubles events, which consist of both alternate shot and best ball formats (also known as "foursomes" and "fourball" matches respectively). Each match, whether it be a doubles or singles match, is worth one point with a half-point awarded to each team in the event of a halved match.

There have been frequent small changes to the format, although the final day has always consisted of 12 singles matches. The contest was extended from three days to four in 2000. In 2015, there were nine foursome doubles matches, nine fourball doubles matches, and 12 singles matches. With a total of 30 points, a team needed to get 15.5 points to win the Cup.

Ties
Until the 2005 event, prior to the start of the final day matches, the captains selected one player to play in a tie-breaker in the event of a tie at the end of the final match. Upon a tie, the captains would reveal the players who would play a sudden-death match to determine the winner. In 2003, however, the tiebreaker match ended after three holes because of darkness, and the captains, Gary Player and Jack Nicklaus, agreed that the Cup would be shared by both teams.

From 2005 to 2013, singles matches ending level at the end of the regulation 18 holes were to be extended to extra holes until the match was won outright. All singles matches would continue in this format until one team reaches the required point total to win the Presidents Cup. Remaining singles matches were only to be played to the regulation 18 holes and could be halved. Although this rule was in force for five Presidents Cup contests, no matches actually went beyond 18 holes.

History

The event was created and is organized by the PGA Tour.

Each contest has an Honorary Chairman.

Charity
There is no prize money awarded at the Presidents Cup. The net proceeds are distributed to charities nominated by the players, captains, and captains' assistants. The first ten Presidents Cups raised over US$32 million for charities around the world.

Results 

Of the 14 matches, the United States team has won 12, the International Team has won 1, with 1 match tied

Future venues
2024 Royal Montreal Golf Club (2), Montreal, Quebec, Canada
2026 Medinah Country Club, Medinah, Illinois, United States
2028 Kingston Heath Golf Club, Melbourne, Victoria, Australia
2030 Bellerive Country Club, Town and Country, Missouri, United States
2032 TBA
2034 TBA
2036 TBA
2038 TBA
2040 Course TBD, Melbourne, Victoria, Australia

Records

Most appearances on a team: 12° Phil Mickelson (USA), 1994–2017
Most points: 32° Phil Mickelson (USA) (26–16–13 record)
Most singles points won: 7° Tiger Woods (USA) (7–2–0 record)
Most foursomes points won: 14° Phil Mickelson (USA) (12–6–4 record)
Most fourball points won: 13° Phil Mickelson (USA) (10–5–6 record)
Most points in a single contest: 5° Mark O'Meara (USA) 1996° Shigeki Maruyama (Int) 1998° Tiger Woods (USA) 2009° Jim Furyk (USA) 2011° Branden Grace (Int) 2015° Jordan Spieth (USA) 2022
Youngest player: ° Ryo Ishikawa (Int) 2009
Oldest player: ° Jay Haas (USA) 2003

Sources

See also
List of American Presidents Cup golfers
List of International Presidents Cup golfers
List of Presidents Cup broadcasters
Junior Presidents Cup

References

External links

 
Team golf tournaments
PGA Tour events
Recurring sporting events established in 1994
1994 establishments in Virginia